Giovanna Gagliardo (born 12 December 1943) is an Italian film director and screenwriter. Her 1982 film Via degli specchi was entered into the 33rd Berlin International Film Festival. She is also known as a longtime partner (1968–80) to major Hungarian film director Miklós Jancsó.

Selected filmography
 The Assassin (1961)
 Private Vices, Public Pleasures (1976)
 Via degli specchi (1982)

References

External links

1943 births
Living people
Italian film directors
Italian women film directors
Italian screenwriters
People from the Province of Cuneo